Abraham Adelaja (born 31 January 1988, Abuja) is a Nigerian professional footballer who plays as a striker.

Club career
In July 2013, Adelaja arrived in Portugal to represent Farense. On 6 July 2015, he moved to fellow Segunda Liga club Mafra.

On 29 August 2016, Adelaja signed a contract with Albanian Superliga side Korabi Peshkopi as a free transfer. He was presented on the same day along with Nderim Nexhipi where he was allocated squad number 88.

References

External links

1988 births
Living people
Yoruba sportspeople
Nigerian footballers
Nigerian expatriate footballers
Shahr Khodro F.C. players
Machine Sazi F.C. players
Khatoco Khánh Hòa FC players
S.C. Farense players
C.D. Mafra players
Lusitano F.C. (Portugal) players
C.F. União players
F.C. Felgueiras 1932 players
KF Korabi Peshkopi players
C.D. Fátima players
A.C. Marinhense players
Liga Portugal 2 players
Kategoria Superiore players
V.League 1 players
Association football forwards
Expatriate footballers in Iran
Expatriate footballers in Vietnam
Expatriate footballers in Portugal
Expatriate footballers in Albania
Nigerian expatriate sportspeople in Iran
Nigerian expatriate sportspeople in Vietnam
Nigerian expatriate sportspeople in Portugal
Nigerian expatriate sportspeople in Albania
People from Abuja